Lavik Church is a parish church of the Church of Norway in Høyanger Municipality in Vestland county, Norway. It is located in the village of Lavik on the northern shore of the Sognefjorden. It is the church for the Lavik parish which is part of the Sunnfjord prosti (deanery) in the Diocese of Bjørgvin. The white, wooden church was built in an octagonal design in 1865 using plans drawn up by the architect Christian Heinrich Grosch. The church seats about 380 people.

History
The earliest existing historical records of the church date back to the year 1327, but it was not new that year. The first church was likely a wooden stave church that was built in the 12th century. In 1594, the old church was torn down and its materials were sold. A new, small, timber-framed long church was built on the same site as the previous church. There was also a small church porch on the west end of the building. Prior to 1809, Lavik church was an annex church in the Evindvig parish, but since 1809 it has been its own parish.

In 1814, this church served as an election church. Together with more than 300 other parish churches across Norway, it was a polling station for elections to the 1814 Norwegian Constituent Assembly which wrote the Constitution of Norway. This was Norway's first national elections. Each church parish was a constituency that elected people called "electors" who later met together in each county to elect the representatives for the assembly that was to meet in Eidsvoll later that year.

The new Swiss chalet style building was constructed because the old church from 1594 was deemed to be was too small for the parish. The new church was designed by Christian Heinrich Grosch and the lead builder was Johannes Øvsthus. The new building had an octagonal floorplan with a  nave and a rectangular  choir extension to the east. There is also a small, rectangular church porch extension to the west of the nave. It was consecrated on 10 December 1865 by the local Dean Thomas Erichsen. After the new church was completed, the old church was torn down.

Media gallery

See also
List of churches in Bjørgvin

References

Høyanger
Churches in Vestland
Wooden churches in Norway
Octagonal churches in Norway
19th-century Church of Norway church buildings
Churches completed in 1865
12th-century establishments in Norway
Norwegian election church